University of Sadat City (Arabic: جامعة مدينة السادات) is an Egyptian Governmental University, at first, established as a branch of Menofia University then considered as a self-governmental University, which founded by the presidential decree no. 180/2013, on 13/03/2013, The USC campus, is located in Sadat city - Northwestern Cairo.

The USC campus currently comprises eight colleges and two institutes.

Faculties and Institutes 
The USC campus currently comprises the following eight colleges and institutes:
 Faculty Of Physical Education
 Faculty Of Tourism and Hotels
 Faculty Of Veterinary Medicine
 Faculty Of Pharmacy
 Faculty Of Commerce
 Faculty Of Education
 Faculty Of Law
 Genetic Engineering and Biotechnology Research Institute
 Institute of Environmental Studies and Research

External links 

 Official Website.

Sadat City
Educational institutions established in 2013
2013 establishments in Egypt